Mohammed Beck Hadjetlaché (20 May 1868, he also sometimes stated 1870 or 1872, Istanbul - 4 November 1929, Stockholm) was a Circassian journalist, writer, MI6 (SIS) and cheka agent. Hadjetlaché used many assumed identities, but his real name was probably Kasi Beck Akhmetukov.

Biography
Kasi Beck Akhmetukov was born in Istanbul in a Circassian family, which fled from Circassia after the Russian-Circassian War. In 1878 his father, a Bashi-bazouk leader, was killed in the Russo-Turkish War (1877–1878). In 1882 he emigrated to Russia, and was adopted by the childless Ettinger family and called Grigory. In 1890s he wrote and published several novels and short stories under the pen name Hadjetlaché.

In 1902 Hadjetlaché joined the Socialist-Revolutionary Party. In 1908 he started to publish the magazine "Moslem" in Paris and the newspaper "In the world of Islam" in Saint Petersburg.

In 1916 Hadjetlaché offered to run an "anti-German and anti-Turkish propaganda campaign among the Moslems on a worldwide scale" for the Russian government and asked for money.

In 1917 he was recruited by what was then MI1c while working at a British propaganda unit called the Anglo-Russian Commission in St Petersburg. He was being run as an agent by Captain John Dymoke Scale.

He left Soviet Russia and came to Sweden in 1918, where under the cheka and SIS direction he organized a fake White Terrorist cell planning to help in the counter revolutionary struggle against the Bolsheviks with Stockholm as his base. The goal of the operation was to portray all white émigrés as bloodthirsty terrorists and provoke Swedish police actions against Russian emigrants. Hadjetlaché purchased a house in the woods outside of Stockholm. To that house he and his gang brought people that he accused of being Bolshevik agents whom he killed and their bodies were then dropped in a nearby lake. When the police discovered the gang in 1919, three murdered bodies were found in the Norrviken lake.

The confirmed victims were engineer Karl Calvé (originally possibly Gleb Varfolomeyev), journalist and Soviet diplomatic courier Juri Levi (Paul) Levitsky and nobleman Nicolai Ardachev, a doctor in law. According to Hadjetlaché's own “death list” it is likely that more people had been killed.

The murders were used for propaganda purposes by the Soviet press. Soviet writer Alexei Tolstoi included it in his novel "Emigrants".

Hadjetlaché was sentenced to death on 28 May 1920 by decapitation, later converted to life in accordance with the de facto moratorium persisting before abolition the next year. He died in 1929 in Långholmen Prison, shortly after a failed application for commutation to time served. Hadjetlaché was the last person to be sentenced to death in Sweden, although the death penalty remained in military law until 1972.

Carl Sandburg wrote a poem about Hadjetlaché under the title "Mohammed Bek Hadjetlaché." It is written as if Sandburg had personally met Mohammed Beck Hadjetlaché.

Sources
 Lundberg, Svante. Ryssligan (2004). 
 Fonds Mahomet-Beck Hadjetlache
 О кази-беке Ахметукове (Магомкд-Бек Хаджетлаше) и его потомках
 Nordisk Familjebok pages 191-192

References

External links

1929 deaths
Emigrants from the Ottoman Empire to the Russian Empire
Muslims from the Russian Empire
Soviet Muslims
Soviet people who died in prison custody
Prisoners sentenced to life imprisonment by Sweden
Prisoners who died in Swedish detention
Soviet people convicted of murder
Soviet people imprisoned abroad
Russian people imprisoned abroad
Russian people who died in prison custody
Russian people convicted of murder
People convicted of murder by Sweden
1868 births
Soviet prisoners sentenced to death
Russian prisoners sentenced to death
Prisoners sentenced to death by Sweden